Erc  was king of Irish Dál Riata from 439 until 474, succeeding Eochaid Muinremuir. He was the father of three sons: Fergus Mór, Loarn and Oengus. He also may have been the great-grandfather of Muirchertach mac Muiredaig. Confusion arises from the latter's matronym, Macc Ercae, said to come from his legendary mother Erca ingen Loarn, daughter of Loarn mac Eirc. She married Muiredach mac Eógain. According to the Duan Albanach and the Senchus Fer n-Alban, Erc of Dál Riata's father was Eochaid Muinremuir, son of Áengus Fert, son of Fedlimid, son of Oengus, son of another Fedlimid, son of Senchormaich, son of Cruitlinde, son of Findfece, son of Archircir, son of Eochaid Antoit, son of Fiacha Cathmail, son of Cairbre Riata, son of Conaire Cóem and Saraid ingen Chuinn.

Suggestions that he was identical with Muiredach mac Eógain and thus belonged to the Uí Néill are based on late sources, such as the Annals of the Four Masters. In fact the Dál Riata are considered Érainn or Darini and claimed to be descendants of the famous Érainn king Conaire Mór. It is typical in late genealogies for unrelated peoples or those only related through marriage to be worked into a single genealogical scheme and all be made descendants of the same legendary founder.

Erc is significant as he has been traditionally regarded as the ancestor, through his son Fergus Mor, of the kings of Dalriada, and through them the Kings of Scotland, but more recently much of this tradition has been questioned.

References

 Francis John Byrne, Irish Kings and High-Kings. Four Courts Press. 2nd edition, 2001.
 Thomas Charles-Edwards, Early Christian Ireland. Cambridge University Press. 2000.
 Donnchadh Ó Corráin (ed.), Genealogies from Rawlinson B 502, at University College Cork: Corpus of Electronic Texts. 1997.
 John O'Donovan (ed. and tr.), Annála Ríoghachta Éireann. Annals of the Kingdom of Ireland by the Four Masters, from the Earliest Period to the Year 1616. 7 vols. Royal Irish Academy. Dublin. 1848–51. 2nd edition, 1856.
 John O'Hart, Irish Pedigrees. Dublin. 5th edition, 1892.
 T.F. O'Rahilly, Early Irish History and Mythology. Dublin Institute for Advanced Studies. 1946.
Geni, Geni Geni. "Erc Mac Echach, Rí Na Dál Riata." Erc Mac Echach, Rí Na Dál Riata. Geni, 1 Jan. 2016. Web. 2016

Kings of Dál Riata
5th-century Irish monarchs